The Badlands are a mountain range in Riverside County, California. They are also known as the San Timoteo Badlands. The range trend northwest–southeast with the San Jacinto Valley to the southwest, the San Timoteo Canyon to the northeast and the San Jacinto Mountains to the east. These mountains separate the cities of Beaumont and  Moreno Valley. The mountains are crossed by California State Route 60, California State Route 79, and a handful of smaller roads.

References

Mountain ranges of Riverside County, California
Mountain ranges of Southern California